The 2011 New Zealand bravery awards were announced via a Special Honours List on 2 April 2011. Some recipients were recognised for acts of bravery following the Napier shootings that occurred on 7 May 2009.

New Zealand Bravery Star (NZBS)
Constable Michael John Burne – New Zealand Police
Austin Bernard Hemmings – Posthumous award – died 25 September 2018.
Leonard Rex Holmwood.
Senior Constable Dennis Michael Hurworth – New Zealand Police.
Antony McClean – Posthumous award – died 15 April 2008.
Anthony Walter Mulder – Posthumous award – died 15 April 2008.
Detective Sergeant Timothy Nigel Smith – New Zealand Police.
Senior Constable Paul Anthony Symonds – New Zealand Police.

New Zealand Bravery Decoration (NZBD)
Sergeant Heath Courtenay Jones – New Zealand Police.
Senior Sergeant Anthony James Miller – New Zealand Police.
Wing Commander Anthony Frederick Ronald Millsom – Royal New Zealand Air Force.
Constable James Alexander Muir – New Zealand Police.
Senior Firefighter Mervyn Raymond Neil – New Zealand Fire Service.
Inspector Michael Ross O'Leary – New Zealand Police.
Constable Kevin Lawrence Rooney – New Zealand Police.

New Zealand Bravery Medal (NZBM)
Peter Winston Booth.
Detective Paul Buckley – New Zealand Police.
James Iain Christie.
Senior Constable Bradley James Clark – New Zealand Police.
Detective Sergeant Nicholas John Clere – New Zealand Police.
Constable Nicholas Warren Corley – New Zealand Police.
Maurice Ugo Conti.
Sophie Conti.
Grant Wayne Exeter.
Donald Garry Fraser.
Peter Alexander Hanne.
Christine Margaret Jackman.
Conor Liam O'Leary
Advanced Paramedic Stephen James Smith – St John Ambulance Service.
Chief Petty Officer Mark Taylor – Royal New Zealand Navy.

New Zealand Order of Merit (MNZM)
Roger Murray Burton – For service to the community.

References

Bravery
Bravery awards
New Zealand bravery awards